The 2000 Nevada Wolf Pack football team represented the University of Nevada, Reno during the 2000 NCAA Division I-A football season. Nevada competed as a first-year member of the Western Athletic Conference (WAC). The Wolf Pack were led by first-year head coach Chris Tormey and played their home games at Mackay Stadium.

Schedule

Roster

Game summaries

at Oregon

TCU

at Wyoming

Colorado State

at UNLV

at Fresno State

San Jose State

at SMU

UTEP

at Hawaii

Rice

at Tulsa

References

Nevada
Nevada Wolf Pack football seasons
Nevada Wolf Pack football